The first WAFU Under-20 Championship took place in Nigeria. The tournament is sometimes referred to as the Ibori Cup and is contested by countries in the West Africa region.

Eligible Participants
 
 
  (withdrew)
 
 
 
 
  (withdrew)

Group A

Group B

Group C

Group D

Quarter finals

Semi finals

Third place match

Final

See also 
 WAFU U-20 Championship

External links
 Official Site

Wafu U-20 Championship, 2008
International association football competitions hosted by Nigeria
WAFU U-20 Championship
Wafu